Triphenyl tetrazolium chloride, TTC, or simply tetrazolium chloride (with the formula 2,3,5-triphenyl-2H-tetrazolium chloride) is a redox indicator commonly used in biochemical experiments especially  to indicate cellular respiration (example: to check for the viability of seeds). It is a white crystalline salt, soluble in water, ethanol and acetone but insoluble in ether.

TTC assay
In the TTC assay (also known as TTC test or tetrazolium test), TTC is used to differentiate between metabolically active and inactive tissues. The white compound is enzymatically reduced to red TPF (1,3,5-triphenylformazan) in living tissues due to the activity of various dehydrogenases (enzymes important in oxidation of organic compounds and thus cellular metabolism), while it remains in its unreacted state in areas of necrosis since these enzymes have either denatured or degraded.

TTC has been employed in autopsy pathology to identify myocardial infarctions. Healthy viable heart muscle will stain deep red from the cardiac lactate dehydrogenase, while areas of potential infarctions will be more pale.

See also 
MTT assay
Seed testing

References

Chlorides
Redox indicators
Tetrazoles